The Last Great Challenge in a Dull World is a 1990 album by New Zealand pianist Peter Jefferies. It was originally released on the Xpressway label, and reissued in 1992 and 1995 by Ajax Records. The reissue was remastered by Jefferies, and also contained tracks from the "Fate of the Human Carbine" 7", which he recorded with guitarist Robbie Muir. "The Fate of the Human Carbine" was later covered by American singer-songwriter Cat Power on her 1996 album What Would the Community Think. In 2013, the album was re-issued through De Stijl and included "The Fate of the Human Carbine"/"Catapult" 7-inch single with the vinyl edition.

Accolades

Track listing

Personnel

Musicians
Kathy Bull – bass guitar on "Chain or Reaction"
Peter Jefferies – vocals, piano, drums, percussion, production, mixing, mastering, engineering
David Mitchell – guitar on "Chain or Reaction", "The Last Great Challenge in a Dull World" and "The Other Side of Reason"
Michael Morley – backwards vocals on "The House of Weariness"
Bruce Russell – guitar on "Guided Tour of a Well Known Street", "The House of Weariness" and "Cold View", vocals on "The House of Weariness"
Robbie Yeats – drums on "Guided Tour of a Well Known Street"

Production and additional personnel
Alastair Galbraith – mixing, guitar on "While I've Been Waiting", violin on "Listening In"
Stephen Kilroy – mixing on "The Fate of the Human Carbine" and "Catapult"
Barry McConnachie – mastering
Robbie Muir – guitar and mixing on "The Fate of the Human Carbine" and "Catapult"
Nigel Taylor – mixing, percussion on "Domestica", piano on "The House of Weariness"

References

External links 
 

1990 albums
Peter Jefferies albums